Inhottu (Inhottujärvi) is a rather small lake in the Karvianjoki main catchment area. It is located in the region of Satakunta in Finland. It is a bifurcation lake because there are two outlets on the lake: the waters flow into the Gulf of Bothnia through the river Eteläjoki in Pori and into lake Isojärvi through the river Pomarkunjoki.

Inhottu is a European Natura 2000 area because of the protection of birds.

See also
List of lakes in Finland

References

Bifurcation lakes
Lakes of Pomarkku